Ruhabad (also Romanized as Rūḩābād) is a village in Rudbar-e Shahrestan Rural District, Alamut-e Gharbi District, Qazvin County, Qazvin Province, Iran. At the 2006 census, its population was 97, in 28 families.

References 

Populated places in Qazvin County